For the first time in the history, Football Club Lovćen Cetinje gained a participation in the European competitions after the season 2013/14. As a Montenegrin Cup winner and the runner-up in the Montenegrin First League, Lovćen debuted in Europa League 2014/15.

Appearances

During their first season in Europe, Lovćen played in the first qualifying leg of Europa League 2014/15. Their first opponent was Željezničar Sarajevo from Bosnia and Herzegovina. After the draw in the first match in Sarajevo (0:0), Lovćen lost the second game in Petrovac (0:1).

See also
 FK Lovćen
 FK Lovćen in the First League
 List of FK Lovćen seasons
 Cetinje

FK Lovćen Cetinje